Easter Tournaments in Bratislava was an annual spring international football tournament held in Bratislava, Czechoslovakia, from 1955 to 1957. The tournament was held in the month of April.

Each of the teams played 2 round-robin 90-minute matches in the tournament.

Finals

External links
 Easter Tournaments in Bratislava at Rec.Sport.Soccer Statistics Foundation.

International association football competitions hosted by Czechoslovakia
1954–55 in Czechoslovak football
1955–56 in Czechoslovak football
1956–57 in Czechoslovak football
1954–55 in Hungarian football
1955–56 in Hungarian football
1954–55 in Swedish football
1957 in Brazilian football
1956–57 in Belgian football
1955–56 in Yugoslav football